Carlisle is a village in Saint George Parish, Antigua and Barbuda.

Demographics 
Carlisle has one enumeration district, ED 41700.

Census Data (2011) 
Source:

References 

Populated places in Antigua and Barbuda
Saint George Parish, Antigua and Barbuda